Cuculus is a genus of cuckoos which has representatives in most of the Old World, although the greatest diversity is in tropical southern and southeastern Asia.

Taxonomy
The genus Cuculus was introduced in 1758 by the Swedish naturalist Carl Linnaeus in the tenth edition of his Systema Naturae. The genus name is the Latin word for "cuckoo". The type species is the common cuckoo (Cuculus canorus).

Species
The genus contains 11 species:
 Black cuckoo, Cuculus clamosus
 Red-chested cuckoo, Cuculus solitarius
 Lesser cuckoo, Cuculus poliocephalus
 Sulawesi cuckoo or Sulawesi hawk-cuckoo, Cuculus crassirostris
 Indian cuckoo, Cuculus micropterus
 Madagascar cuckoo, Cuculus rochii
 African cuckoo, Cuculus gularis
 Himalayan cuckoo, Cuculus saturatus
 Oriental cuckoo, Cuculus optatus (formerly horsfieldi) (split from C. saturatus)
 Sunda cuckoo, Cuculus lepidus (split from C. saturatus)
 Common cuckoo, Cuculus canorus

Some sources also include the pallid cuckoo in this genus, although there is disagreement about appropriate classification.

The hawk-cuckoos are now placed in a separate genus, Hierococcyx, while the pallid cuckoo belongs in Cacomantis.

These birds are of variable size with slender bodies, long tails and strong legs. Most occur in open forests, but some prefer more open country. Several species are migratory.

These are vocal species, with persistent and loud calls. They feed on large insects, with hairy caterpillars, which are distasteful to many birds, being a speciality. One or two species will also take some fruit.

Cuculus cuckoos are brood parasites, that is, they lay a single egg in the nests of various passerine hosts. The best-known example is the European common cuckoo. The female cuckoo in each case replaces one of the host's eggs with one of her own. The cuckoo egg hatches earlier than the host's, and the chick grows faster; in most cases the cuckoo chick evicts the eggs or young of the host species.

Cuculus species lay coloured eggs to match those of their passerine hosts. Female cuckoos specialise in a particular host species (generally the species that raised them) and lay eggs that closely resemble the eggs of that host.

A species may consist of several gentes, with each gens specialising in a particular host. There is some evidence that the gentes are genetically different from one another though other authorities state that as female cuckoos mate with males of any gens, genes flow between gentes.

References

Further reading
 

 
Bird genera